Johannes Yrttiaho (born in Turku 22 January 1980) is a Finnish politician currently serving in the Parliament of Finland for the Left Alliance at the Finland Proper constituency.

Electoral history

Municipal elections

Parliamentary elections

County elections

References

Living people
Members of the Parliament of Finland (2019–23)
Left Alliance (Finland) politicians
21st-century Finnish politicians
1980 births